A magician, also known as an enchanter/enchantress, mage, magic-user, archmage, sorcerer/sorceress, spell-caster, warlock, witch, or wizard,
priest or priestess, is someone who uses or practices magic derived from supernatural, occult, or arcane sources. Magicians are common figures in works of fantasy, such as fantasy literature and role-playing games, and enjoy a rich history in mythology, legends, fiction, and folklore.

Character archetypes

In medieval chivalric romance, the wizard often appears as a wise old man and acts as a mentor, with Merlin from the King Arthur stories being a prime example. Wizards such as Gandalf in The Lord of the Rings and Albus Dumbledore from Harry Potter are also featured as mentors, and Merlin remains prominent as both an educative force and mentor in modern works of Arthuriana. Other magicians, such as Saruman from The Lord of the Rings or Lord Voldemort from Harry Potter, can appear as hostile villains. Villainous sorcerers were so crucial to pulp fantasy that the genre in which they appeared was dubbed "sword and sorcery".

Ursula K. Le Guin's A Wizard of Earthsea explored the question of how wizards learned their art, introducing to modern fantasy the role of the wizard as protagonist. This theme has been further developed in modern fantasy, often leading to wizards as heroes on their own quests. Such heroes may have their own mentor, a wizard as well.

Wizards can be cast similarly to the absent-minded professor: being foolish and prone to misconjuring. They can also be capable of great magic, both good or evil. Even comical wizards are often capable of great feats, such as those of Miracle Max in The Princess Bride; although he is a washed-up wizard fired by the villain, he saves the dying hero.

Appearance
Wizards are often depicted as old, white-haired, and with long white beards majestic enough to occasionally host lurking woodland creatures. This depiction predates the modern fantasy genre, being derived from the traditional image of wizards such as Merlin. 

In the Dragonlance campaign setting of the Dungeons & Dragons role-playing game, wizards show their moral alignment by their robes.

Terry Pratchett described robes as a magician's way of establishing to those they meet that they are capable of practicing magic.

Limits
To introduce conflict, writers of fantasy fiction often place limits on the magical abilities of wizards to prevent them from solving problems too easily. In Larry Niven's The Magic Goes Away, once an area's mana is exhausted, no one can use magic. A common limit invented by Jack Vance in his The Dying Earth series, and later popularized in role-playing games is that a wizard can only cast a specific number of spells in a day.

Magic can also require various sacrifices or the use of certain materials, such as gemstones, blood, or a live sacrifice. Even if the magician lacks scruples, obtaining the material may be difficult.

The extent of a wizard's knowledge is limited to which spells a wizard knows and can cast. Magic may also be limited by its danger; if a powerful spell can cause grave harm if miscast, wizards are likely to be wary of using it. Other forms of magic are limited by consequences that, while not inherently dangerous, are at least undesirable. In A Wizard of Earthsea, every act of magic distorts the equilibrium of the world, which in turn has far-reaching consequences that can affect the entire world and everything in it. As a result, competent wizards do not use their magic frivolously.

In Terry Pratchett's Discworld series, the Law of Conservation of Reality is a principle imposed by forces wanting wizards to not destroy the world, and works to limit how much power it is humanly possible to wield. Whatever your means, the effort put into reaching the ends stays the same. For example, when the wizards of Unseen University are chasing the hapless wizard Rincewind in the forest of Skund, the wizards send out search teams to go and find him on foot. The Archchancellor beats them to it by using a powerful spell from his own office, and while he gets there first by clever use of his spell, he has used no less effort than the others.

Names and terminology
People who work magic are called by several names in fantasy works, and terminology differs widely from one fantasy world to another. While derived from real-world vocabulary, the terms wizard, witch, warlock, enchanter/enchantress, sorcerer(ess), druid(ess), magician, mage, and magus have different meanings depending upon context and the story in question.

The term archmage is used in fantasy works as a title for a powerful magician or a leader of magicians.

Reasons for distinguishing magicians

In the Enchanted Forest Chronicles, Patricia Wrede depicts wizards who use magic based on their staves and magicians who practice several kinds of magic, including wizard magic; in the Regency fantasies, she and Caroline Stevermer depict magicians as identical to wizards, though inferior in skill and training.

Mike Resnick's The Times & Life of Lucifer Jones describes the distinction thus: "The difference between a wizard and a sorcerer is comparable to that between, say, a lion and a tiger, but wizards are acutely status-conscious, and to them, it's more like the difference between a lion and a dead kitten." In David Eddings's The Belgariad and The Malloreon series, several protagonists refer to their abilities powered by sheer will as "sorcery" and look down on the term "magician", which specifically refers to summoners of demonic agents.

In role-playing games, the types of magic-users are more delineated and are named so that the players and game masters can know which rules apply. Gary Gygax and Dave Arneson introduced the term "magic-user" in the original Dungeons & Dragons as a generic term for a practitioner of magic (in order to avoid the connotations of terms such as wizard or warlock); this lasted until the second edition of Advanced Dungeons & Dragons, where it was replaced with mage (later to become wizard). The exact rules vary from game to game. The wizard or mage, as a character class, is distinguished by the ability to cast certain kinds of magic but being weak in combat; subclasses are distinguished by strengths in some areas of magic and weakness in others. Sorcerers are distinguished from wizards as having an innate gift with magic, as well as having mystical or magical ancestry. Warlocks are distinguished from wizards as creating forbidden "pacts" with powerful creatures to harness their innate magical gifts.

Enchanters often practice a type of magic that produces no physical effects on objects or people, but rather deceives the observer or target through the use of illusions. Enchantresses in particular practice this form of magic, often to seduce. For instance, the Lady of the Green Kirtle in C.S. Lewis's The Silver Chair enchants Rilian into forgetting his father and Narnia; when that enchantment is broken, she attempts further enchantments with a sweet-smelling smoke and a thrumming musical instrument to baffle him and his rescuers into forgetting them again.

The term sorcerer is more frequently used when the magician in question is evil. This may derive from its use in sword and sorcery, where the hero would be the sword-wielder, leaving the sorcery for his opponent.

Witch also carries evil connotations. L. Frank Baum named Glinda the "Good Witch of the South" in The Wonderful Wizard of Oz. In The Marvelous Land of Oz, he dubbed her "Glinda the Good," and from that point forward and in subsequent books, Baum referred to her as a sorceress rather than a witch to avoid the term that was more regarded as evil.

Gender-based titles
Wizard and warlock usually refer to a male, while witch can refer to any gender but is more often ascribed towards women. But not always, there are some cases of (especially wizard) being used as unisex titles.

Traits of magicians

A common motif in fiction is that the ability to use magic is innate and often rare, or gained through a large amount of study and practice. In J. R. R. Tolkien's Middle-earth, it is mostly limited to non-humans, though some people gain small amounts and become known as sorcerers (wizards being powerful spirits). In many writers' works, it is reserved for a select group of humans, such as in Katherine Kurtz's Deryni novels, JK Rowling's Harry Potter novels or Randall Garrett's Lord Darcy universe.

Education

Magicians normally learn spells by reading ancient tomes called grimoires, which may have magical properties of their own. Sorcerers in Conan the Barbarian often gained powers from such books, which are demarcated by their strange bindings. In worlds where magic is not an innate trait, the scarcity of these strange books may be a facet of the story; in Poul Anderson's A Midsummer Tempest, Prince Rupert seeks out the books of the magician Prospero to learn magic. The same occurs in the Dungeons and Dragons-based novel series Dragonlance Chronicles, wherein Raistlin Majere seeks out the books of the sorcerer Fistandantilus. In JK Rowling's Harry Potter series, wizards already have skills of magic but they need to practise magic in Wizarding Schools in order to be able to use it properly.

Some magicians, even after training, continue their education by learning more spells, inventing new ones (and new magical objects), or rediscovering ancient spells, beings, or objects. For example, Dr. Strange from the Marvel Universe continues to learn about magic even after being named Sorcerer Supreme. He often encounters creatures that haven't been seen for centuries or more. In the same universe, Dr. Doom continues to pursue magical knowledge after mastering it by combining magic with science. Fred and George Weasley from Harry Potter invent new magical items and sell them as legitimate defense items, new spells and potions can be made in the Harry Potter Universe; Severus Snape invented a variety of jinxes and hexes as well as substantial improvements in the process of making potions; Albus Dumbledore, along with Nicolas Flamel, is credited with discovering the twelve uses of dragon's blood.

Magical materials

Historically, many self-proclaimed magicians have required rare and precious materials, such as crystal balls, rare herbs (often picked by prescribed rituals), and elements such as mercury. This is less common in fantasy. Many magicians require no materials at all; those that do may require only simple and easily obtained materials. Role-playing games are more likely to require such materials for at least some spells to prevent characters from casting them too easily.

Wands and staves have long been used as requirements for the magician. Possibly derived from wand-like implements used in fertility rituals, such as apotropaic wands, the earliest known instance of the modern magical wand was featured in the Odyssey, used by Circe to transform Odysseus's men into animals. Italian fairy tales put wands into the hands of powerful fairies by the late Middle Ages. Today, magical wands are widespread and are used from Witch World to Harry Potter. In The Lord of the Rings, Gandalf refuses to surrender his own staff, breaking Saruman's, which strips the latter of his power. This dependency on a particular magical item is common, and necessary to limit the magician's power for the story's sake – without it, the magician's powers may be weakened or absent entirely. In the Harry Potter universe, a wizard must expend much greater effort and concentration to use magic without a wand, and only a few can control magic without one; taking away a wizard's wand in battle essentially disarms them.

Use of magic
Nevertheless, many magicians live in pseudo-medieval settings in which their magic is not put to practical use in society; they may serve as mentors, act as quest companions, or even go on a quest themselves, but their magic does not build roads or buildings, provide immunizations, construct indoor plumbing, or do any of the other functions served by machinery; their worlds remain at a medieval level of technology.

Sometimes this is justified by having the negative effects of magic outweigh the positive possibilities. In Barbara Hambley's Windrose Chronicles, wizards are precisely pledged not to interfere because of the terrible damage they can do. In Discworld, the importance of wizards is that they actively do not do magic, because when wizards have access to sufficient "thaumaturgic energy", they develop many psychotic attributes and may eventually destroy the world. This may be a direct effect or the result of a miscast spell wreaking terrible havoc.

In other works, developing magic is difficult. In Rick Cook's Wizardry series, the extreme danger presented by magic and the difficulty of analyzing the magic have stymied magic and left humanity at the mercy of the dangerous elves until a wizard summons a computer programmer from a parallel world — ours — to apply the skills he learned in our world to magic.

At other times, magic and technology do develop in tandem; this is most common in the alternate history genre. Patricia Wrede's Regency fantasies include a Royal Society of Wizards and a technological level equivalent to the actual Regency; Randall Garrett's Lord Darcy series, Robert A. Heinlein's Magic, Incorporated, and Poul Anderson's Operation Chaos all depict modern societies with magic equivalent to twentieth-century technology. In Harry Potter, wizards have magical equivalents to non-magical inventions; sometimes they duplicate them, as with the Hogwarts Express train.

The powers ascribed to magicians often affect their roles in society. In practical terms, their powers may give them authority; magicians may advise kings, such as Gandalf in The Lord of the Rings and Belgarath and Polgara the Sorceress in David Eddings's The Belgariad. They may be rulers themselves, as in E.R. Eddison's The Worm Ouroboros, where both the heroes and the villains, although kings and lords, supplement their physical power with magical knowledge, or as in Jonathan Stroud's Bartimaeus Trilogy, where magicians are the governing class. On the other hand, magicians often live like hermits, isolated in their towers and often in the wilderness, bringing no change to society. In some works, such as many of Barbara Hambly's, they are despised and outcast specifically because of their knowledge and powers.

In the magic-noir world of the Dresden Files, wizards generally keep a low profile, though there is no explicit prohibition against interacting openly with non-magical humanity. The protagonist of the series, Harry Dresden, openly advertises in the Yellow Pages under the heading "Wizard" and maintains a business office, though other wizards tend to resent him for practicing his craft openly. Dresden primarily uses his magic to make a living finding lost items and people, performing exorcisms, and providing protection against the supernatural.

In the series Sorcerous Stabber Orphen human forms of life should have only been capable of acquiring divine magic powers through individual spiritual development, whereas the race of human magicians with inborn magical ability ended in conflict with pureblood human society, because this race appeared as a result of an experiment of mixing humans with non-human sentient Heavenly Beings that acquired magic powers not through spiritual development, but through deep studying of laws of nature and by falsely causing the world’s laws to react to actions of the Heavenly Beings as to actions of Divinities. In the Harry Potter series, the Wizarding World hides themselves from the rest of the non-magic world, because, as described by Hagrid simply, "Why? Blimey, Harry, everyone’d be wantin’ magic solutions to their problems. Nah, we’re best left alone.”

References

External links

Patricia Wrede, "Magic and Magicians", Fantasy Worldbuilding Questions

Fairy tale stock characters
Fantasy tropes
Jungian archetypes
 
Supernatural legends